Wilf is a masculine given name, most commonly a diminutive form of Wilfred or Wilfrid. It is also a nickname and a surname.

People

Given name
 Wilfred Arthur (1919–2000), Australian World War II fighter ace
 Wilf Barber (1901–1968), English cricketer
 Charles Wilf Carter (musician) (1904–1996), Canadian country music singer and yodeler
 Wilf Copping (1909–1980), English footballer
 Wilf Cude (1910–1968), Welsh hockey player
 Wilf Field (1915–1979), Canadian hockey player
 Wilf Hanni, politician and oil industry consultant
 Wilf Homenuik (born 1935), Canadian golfer 
 Wilf Hurd (born 1950), Canadian politician
 Wilf Kirkham (1901–1974), British football player
 Wilf Low (1884–1933), Scottish footballer
 Wilf Loughlin, Canadian hockey player
 Wilf Lunn, British television presenter
 Wilf Mannion (1918–2000), English footballer
 Wilf McGuinness (born 1937), English football player and manager
 Wilf O'Reilly (born 1964), British speed skater
 Wilf Paiement (born 1955), Canadian hockey player
 Wilf Proudfoot (born 1921), British politician
 Wilf Rostron (born 1956), English footballer
 Wilf Slack (1954–1989), English cricketer
 Wilf Toman (1874–1917), English footballer
 Wilf Waller (1877–?), South African football player
 Wilf Wedmann (born 1948), Canadian high jumper
 Wilf Wild (1893–1950), British football manager
 Wilf Wooller (1912–1997), Welsh cricketer, rugby union footballer, administrator and journalist

Surname
 Einat Wilf (born 1970), Israeli politician and member of the Knesset
 Harry Wilf (1921–1992), Polish-born American businessman, brother of Joseph Wilf
 Leonard Wilf, American businessman, co-owner of the Minnesota Vikings, son of Harry
 Orin Wilf (born 1973/74), American real estate developer, son of Leonard
 Herbert Wilf (1931–2012), American mathematician
 Joseph Wilf (1925–2016), Polish-born American businessman, brother of Harry Wilf
 Mark Wilf (born 1962), president and co-owner of the Minnesota Vikings, son of Joseph
 Zygi Wilf (born 1950), co-owner of the Minnesota Vikings, son of Joseph
 Steven Wilf, American law professor

Fictional characters
 Wilfred Mott, a recurring character in the Doctor Who television series
 Wilf, a wise young man appearing throughout the Chaos Walking book series

See also
 Wilf Campus, the main campus of Yeshiva University, a private university in New York City
 Wilfried (given name)
 Wilfred (given name)
 Wilfredo
 Wilfie, a nickname

English-language masculine given names
Hypocorisms
English masculine given names